Carolina is a neighborhood on the island of Saint John in the United States Virgin Islands. It is located in the hills to the west of Coral Bay.

References

Populated places in Saint John, U.S. Virgin Islands